Osmanbey is one of the four neighbourhoods (together with Teşvikiye, Maçka and Pangaltı) within the Nişantaşı quarter of the Şişli district in Istanbul, Turkey.

Osmanbey is also home to the Beth Israel Synagogue built in 1940. The Turkish-Armenian journalist Hrant Dink was murdered outside the office of Agos Newspaper in Osmanbey in 2007.

References

Şişli
Quarters in Istanbul